Blažo Jovanović (Serbo-Croatian Cyrillic; Блажо Јовановић; ; 28 March 1907 – 4 February 1976) was a Montenegrin politician and revolutionary army commander in the Yugoslav Partisans. He served as the first President of the People's Assembly of Montenegro and was also the speaker of the Parliament of the People's Republic of Montenegro from 1954 to 1963.

Biography 
Blažo Jovanović was born in Podgorica, the largest city of Principality of Montenegro, into a middle class family. During World War II, he was one of the most important leaders of the Provincial Committee of the Yugoslav Communist Party of Montenegro, the Bay of Kotor and the Sangiaccato; in the summer of 1941 he was with Milovan Đilas, one of the main leaders of the Montenegrin insurrection against the Italian occupant.

On 18 July 1941 he practically assumed the function of political commissar with the title of "person for the connection with the people" of the so-called "supreme temporary command" of the insurrectionary forces in Montenegro, while Đilas became the superior commander, and Arso Jovanović, a distant relative of Blažo, became the chief of staff. He was the second president of the People's Assembly of Montenegro, he was also president of the Parliament of the People's Republic of Montenegro from 1954 to 1963.

See also
League of Communists of Montenegro
President of the League of Communists of Montenegro

External links

References

Sources
 

1907 births
1976 deaths
Politicians from Podgorica
People of the Principality of Montenegro
League of Communists of Montenegro politicians
Yugoslav Partisans members
Montenegrin communists
Montenegrin atheists
Recipients of the Order of the People's Hero
Recipients of the Order of the Hero of Socialist Labour